Boneh-ye Akhund (also Romanized as Boneh-ye Ākhūnd; also known as Akhoond and Ākhūnd) is a village in Howmeh-ye Sharqi Rural District, in the Central District of Ramhormoz County, Khuzestan Province, Iran. At the 2006 census, its population was 676, in 159 families.

References 

Populated places in Ramhormoz County